The swimming competitions at the 2018 South American Games in Cochabamba took place from 27 to 30 May at the G.A.M.C. Aquatics Center at Mariscal Santa Cruz Park. Open water swimming events were held on 1 June at La Angostura Lake.

Medal summary

Men

Women

References

External links
 2018 South American Games – Swimming 
 2018 South American Games – Open water swimming 
 Results
 Results book

2018 South American Games events
2018
South American Games